Kurt Dunham (born 6 December 1991 in Somerset, Tasmania) is a former Australian professional snooker player.

Career
Dunham turned professional in 2016 as the Oceania nomination for the 2016–17 season. His two match wins during his first season as a professional were against Alex Borg and Christopher Keogan at the Paul Hunter Classic and Northern Ireland Open respectively.

Performance and rankings timeline

References

External links

Kurt Dunham at worldsnooker.com
 Kurt Dunham at CueTracker.net: Snooker Results and Statistic Database
 Official website

Australian snooker players
Living people
1991 births
Sportsmen from Tasmania
People from Burnie, Tasmania